Matthew Colin Foulds (born 1  February 1998) is an English footballer who plays for Harrogate Town, on loan from League Two side Bradford City as a defender.

Career
Foulds was one of five academy players who signed their first professional contracts at Bury on 18 February 2015. He was first included in a matchday squad on 22 August of that year, as the Shakers drew 3–3 away to Crewe Alexandra in League One. Three days later, he made his debut in a 1–4 loss to Premier League team Leicester City in a League Cup second-round game at Gigg Lane, replacing Chris Hussey at the start of the second half. On 1 September, Foulds made his first start, playing the entirety of a 2–1 win at Accrington Stanley in the first round of the Football League Trophy.

Premier League club Everton agreed a deal to sign Foulds on 19 November 2015 for an undisclosed fee, with the player set to move to Goodison Park at the beginning of the 2016 January transfer window.

After four years with the club, Foulds was released by Everton at the end of his contract.

In September 2020, Foulds spent time on trial with Serie C club Como and on 14 October, he signed a two-year contract with the club. On 5 January 2021, Foulds agreed to terminate his contract by mutual consent. Later that month he signed a short-term contract with hometown club Bradford City, a club he had originally played youth football for.

On 12 May 2021 he was one of four players offered a new contract by Bradford City. On 15 June 2021, he agreed a one-year contract extension with the club. He was one of seven players offered a new contract by Bradford City at the end of the 2021–22 season. Foulds signed a new two-year deal with the club on 18 May 2022.

In January 2023 he moved on loan to Harrogate Town.

Career statistics

Honours 
Everton U23s

 Premier League Cup: 2018–19

References

1998 births
Living people
Footballers from Bradford
English footballers
Association football defenders
Bradford City A.F.C. players
Bury F.C. players
Everton F.C. players
Como 1907 players
Serie C players
English expatriate footballers
Expatriate footballers in Italy
English expatriate sportspeople in Italy
English Football League players
Harrogate Town A.F.C. players